The Au Cordon Doré at 33 metres event was part of the archery programme at the 1900 Summer Olympics. Qualification for the event was through the large open team events, with the top eight individual archers competing in the individual competition. The identities of the top three archers are the only ones known. No scores are recorded for any of the archers.

Background

This was the only appearance of the men's Au Cordon Doré at 33 metres. A 50 metres version was also held in 1900.

Competition format

Little is known about the format of the competition.

Schedule

Results

References

External links
 International Olympic Committee medal winners database
 De Wael, Herman. Herman's Full Olympians: "Archery 1900". Accessed 17 January 2006.
 

Au Cordon Dore 33 metres